Andrew Watts may refer to:

 Andrew Watts (cricketer) (born 1960), English cricketer
 Andrew Watts (countertenor) (born 1967), British classical countertenor
 Andy Watts, drummer with The Seahorses

See also 
 Andrew Watt (disambiguation)